Devon League 1 is an English level eight rugby union league for clubs based in Devon (and sometimes includes one Cornish club — St Columba & Torpoint). The champions are promoted to Cornwall/Devon and the runner-up plays the second team from Cornwall League 1, with the winning team gaining promotion. Up until the end of the 2017–18 season, teams were relegated to Devon League 2 but since that league has been abolished there is currently no relegation.  

Each year a team from Devon League 1 is picked to take part in the RFU Junior Vase – a national cup competition for clubs at levels 9–12.

Format
The season runs from September to April and comprises twenty-six rounds of matches, with each club playing each of its rivals, home and away. The results of the matches contribute points to the league as follows:
 4 points are awarded for a win
 2 points are awarded for a draw
 0 points are awarded for a loss, however
 1 losing (bonus) point is awarded to a team that loses a match by 7 points or fewer
 1 additional (bonus) point is awarded to a team scoring 4 tries or more in a match.
The top two teams are promoted to Western Counties West and the bottom three teams are relegated to either Cornwall One or Devon One depending on their location.

2021–22

2020–21
Due to the ongoing pandemic, the 2020–21 season was cancelled.

2019–20

2018–19

2017–18

2016–17

Participating clubs and locations

League table

Promotion play-off
Each season, the runners-up of Cornwall 1 and Devon 1, usually participate in a play-off for promotion to Cornwall/Devon. Newquay Hornets declined to play the match and Torrington were promoted.

2015–16

Participating clubs and locations

League table

Promotion play-off
Each season, the runners-up of Cornwall 1 and Devon 1, usually participate in a play-off for promotion to Cornwall/Devon. Camborne School of Mines were due to play Topsham, but it appears that Camborne School of Mines conceded.

2014–15
Plymouth Argaum are the champions and they are promoted to Cornwall/Devon for season 2015–16. The runner-up, Plymstock Albion Oaks won the play-off match against Veor 47 – 3 to also win promotion. The last two teams Old Technicians (8th) and Torrington (9th) are relegated (subject to confirmation) to Devon 2.

Participating clubs and locations

League table

Promotion play-off
Each season, the runners-up of Cornwall 1 and Devon 1, participate in a play-off for promotion to Cornwall/Devon. Plymouth Albion Oaks beat the home team Veor 47 – 3.

2013–14
The 2013–14 Devon 1 consisted of nine clubs; eight from Devon and one from Cornwall. The season started on 7 September 2013 and ended on 5 April 2014 with each team playing each of the other teams twice. South Molton finished in first place and were promoted to Cornwall/Devon, while the runner-up, Totnes, lost to the second team in Cornwall 1, Bodmin, in a play-off and stay in this league. The bottom team, Salcombe, were relegated to Devon 2.

Participating clubs and locations

League table

2012–13

Participating clubs 
 Dartmouth
 Exeter University
 New Cross
 Plymstock Albion Oaks
 Salcombe
 South Molton
 Topsham
 Torrington
 Totnes

Original teams
When league rugby began in 1987 this division contained the following teams:

Exeter Saracens
Honiton
Ilfracombe
Ivybridge
Kingsbridge
Old Technicians
Plymouth Argaum
Plymouth Civil Service
Prince Rock
South Molton
Totnes

Devon League 1 honours

Devon League 1 (1987–1993)
The original Devon 1 (sponsored by Courage) was a tier 9 league with promotion to Cornwall/Devon and relegation to Devon 2.

Devon League 1 (1993–96)
The creation of National 5 South for the 1993–94 season meant that Devon 1 became a tier 10 league. Promotion continued to Cornwall/Devon and relegation to Devon 2. The league continued to be sponsored by Courage.

Devon League 1 (1996–2009)
The cancellation of National 5 South at the end of the 1995–96 season saw Devon League 1 return to being a tier 9 division. Promotion continued to Cornwall/Devon and relegation to Devon 2. From the 2008–09 season onward the league sponsor was Tribute.

Cornwall/Devon League (2009–2018)
Despite widespread league restructuring by the RFU, Devon 1 continued as a tier 9 division, with promotion to Cornwall/Devon and relegation to Devon 2. Tribute continued to sponsor the league.

Devon League 1 (2018–present)
From the 2018–19 Devon 1 continued as a tier 9 division, with promotion to Cornwall/Devon. However, the cancellation of Devon 2 meant there was no longer relegation. Tribute continues to sponsor the league

Promotion play-offs
Since the 2000–01 season there has been a play-off between the runners-up of Cornwall League 1 and Devon League 1 for the third and final promotion place to Cornwall/Devon. The team with the superior league record has home advantage in the tie. At the end of the 2019–20 season the Devon League 1 teams have been the most successful with thirteen wins to the Cornwall League 1 teams five; and the home team has won promotion on twelve occasions compared to the away teams six.

Number of league titles

South Molton (4)
Old Plymothian & Mannamedian (3) 
Wessex (3)
Exeter Saracens (2)
Teignmouth (2)
Withycombe (2)
Devonport Services (1)
Exeter University (1)
Exmouth (1)
Honiton (1)
Kingsbridge (1)
Newton Abbot (1)
North Tawton (1)
Okehampton (1)
Paignton (1)
Plymouth Argaum (1)
Plymouth Barbarians (1)
Plymouth Civil Service (1)
Sidmouth (1)
Tamar Saracens (1)
Tavistock (1)
Torrington (1)
Totnes (1)

Tier nine format since 1987

Notes

See also
 South West Division RFU
 Devon RFU
 Devon 2
 Devon 3
 English rugby union system
 Rugby union in England

References

9
Sports leagues established in 1987
Recurring sporting events established in 1987
Rugby union in Devon
Rugby union in Cornwall